Edgar Alexander Ibarra (born May 31, 1989) is a Venezuelan former professional baseball pitcher. He played in two games for the Los Angeles Angels of Anaheim of Major League Baseball in 2015.

Career

Minnesota Twins
Ibarra began his professional career with the Minnesota Twins' organization. He made his professional debut in 2008 with the GCL Twins, recording a 3.12 ERA in 10 appearances. In 2009 he played for the rookie ball Elizabethton Twins, pitching to a 6-2 record and 2.84 ERA in 50.2 innings of work. He spent the 2010 season with the Single-A Beloit Snappers, pitching to a 6-11 record and 4.81 ERA in 33 appearances. The next year, Ibarra played for the High-A Fort Myers Miracle, registering a 5-10 record and 5.16 ERA in 106.1 innings pitched. He split the 2012 season between the Double-A New Britain Rock Cats and Fort Myers, accumulating a 3-4 record and 4.69 ERA in 42 games. In 2013, Ibarra split the year between the Triple-A Rochester Red Wings and New Britain, posting a stellar 1.93 ERA with 54 strikeouts in 60.2 innings for the two teams. On November 4, 2013, the Twins purchased Ibarra's contract, adding him to their 40-man roster. On August 31, 2014, Ibarra was outrighted off of the 40-man roster. Ibarra spent the 2014 season split between Rochester and New Britain, pitching to a 4.22 ERA in 40 appearances.

Los Angeles Angels of Anaheim
On December 5, 2014, Ibarra signed a minor league contract with the Los Angeles Angels of Anaheim organization that included an invitation to Spring Training. Ibarra was assigned to the Triple-A Salt Lake Bees to begin the year. On June 1, 2015, Ibarra was selected to the 40-man roster and promoted to the major leagues for the first time. He made his MLB on the next day, pitching 2.0 scoreless innings against the Tampa Bay Rays. In the game, Ibarra recorded his first major league strikeout, punching out Rays outfielder Brandon Guyer. Ibarra would appear in 1 more game on June 5, allowing 1 run in 2.0 innings before being optioned down to Triple-A after the game. On June 28, Ibarra was outrighted off of the 40-man roster. He spent the remainder of the year in Salt Lake and elected free agency on October 14, 2015.

Philadelphia Phillies
On January 25, 2016, Ibarra signed a minor league deal with the Philadelphia Phillies organization. Ibarra was released by the team at the end of Spring Training on March 31.

See also
 List of Major League Baseball players from Venezuela

References

External links

1989 births
Living people
Beloit Snappers players
Elizabethton Twins players
Fort Myers Miracle players
Gulf Coast Twins players
Los Angeles Angels players
Major League Baseball pitchers
Major League Baseball players from Venezuela
New Britain Rock Cats players
Rochester Red Wings players
Salt Lake Bees players
Sportspeople from Valencia, Venezuela
Tigres de Aragua players
Venezuelan expatriate baseball players in the United States
Venezuelan Summer League Cubs/Twins players
Venezuelan Summer League Twins/Blue Jays players